Polish Socialist Party – Left (PPS–L), also known as the Young Faction, was one of two factions into which Polish Socialist Party divided itself in 1906. Its primary goal was transform Poland into a socialist country, established through proletarian revolution, and likely a member of some international communist country.

Its opposition was the Polish Socialist Party - Revolutionary Faction (also known as Old Faction – Starzy) which wanted to restore independent Poland, which was envisioned as a representative democracy.

PPS–L for a time gathered most of the former PPS members, but with the failure of the Russian Revolution of 1905 and corresponding revolution in the Kingdom of Poland (1905–1907), it has lost popularity. In 1909 PPS–FR renamed itself back to Polska Partia Socjalistyczna (Polish Socialist Party); the increasingly marginal PPS–L – opposing the First World War and supporting the Russian revolution of 1917 – eventually merged with Social Democracy of the Kingdom of Poland and Lithuania in 1918 to form the Communist Party of Poland.

One member of Lewica was elected to the Central Executive Committee of Ukraine at the Second All-Ukrainian Congress of Soviets in Katerynoslav (Dnipropetrovsk) on 19 March 1918.

Prominent activists of the PPS–L were: Maria Koszutska, Feliks Kon, Stefan Królikowski, Paweł Lewinson, Henryk Walecki and Tadeusz Rechniewski.

PPS–L was recreated in 1926 by PPS activists who opposed PPS involvement with Józef Piłsudski (particularly in the aftermath of his May Coup). It was delegalized in 1931.

See also
Western Rifle Division

1906 establishments in the Russian Empire
1918 disestablishments in Poland
1926 establishments in Poland
1931 disestablishments in Poland
Defunct socialist parties in Poland
Political parties disestablished in 1918
Political parties disestablished in 1931
Political parties established in 1906
Political parties established in 1926
Polish revolutionary organisations
Polish Socialist Party
Political parties of the Russian Revolution